Polygastropteryx is a genus of parasitic flies in the family Tachinidae.

Species
Polygastropteryx bicoloripes Mesnil, 1953

Distribution
India, Myanmar.

References

Monotypic Brachycera genera
Diptera of Asia
Dexiinae
Tachinidae genera